The Amapá Biodiversity Corridor  is an ecological corridor in the state of Amapá, Brazil. It provides a degree of integrated management for conservation units and other areas covering over 70% of the state.

Organization

The project to establish the Amapá Biodiversity Corridor was presented by Antônio Waldez Góes da Silva, governor of Amapá, at the 2003 Durban World Conference of Protected Areas.
The proposed corridor would include marshland, tropical forest and open spaces of importance in maintaining global biodiversity.
The acts that would lead to conservation measures in the corridor were signed in 2005.

The corridor covers more than 70% of the state, and should allow for coordinated management of conservation units and indigenous territories in the state in line with the principles laid out in the Rio Convention on Biodiversity.
The corridor and the conservation units it contains will be co-funded by the Amapá Fund.
The Amapá Initiative is run by a partnership of the state of Amapá, Conservation International and the Fundo Vale for Sustainable Development. It aims to promote governance and institutions, support sustainable development, and promote consistent policies with decisions based on monitoring and evaluating results.

Extent

The corridor links protected areas in Amapá to protected areas in Pará and in other Guiana Shield countries.
As of 2016 it included 12 federal or state protected areas and five indigenous territories.
The Guiana Shield, and the state of Amapá, have great biodiversity.
More than 180 mammal species have been identified in the protected areas, including the jaguar, giant otter, red-handed howler, giant anteater and Amazonian manatee.

The corridor includes the Juminá, Galibi, Uaça, Parque do Tumucumaque and Waiãpi indigenous territories.
Protected areas include:

Notes

Sources

Ecological corridors of Brazil
Protected areas of Amapá
2003 establishments in Brazil